The Cara Cup is an international club rugby union competition between the teams of the New England Free Jacks, of Major League Rugby, Connacht, Ulster, Munster, and Leinster, academy sides of Irish Pro14 teams.

History
On November 9, 2018, This Is American Rugby reported that the Irish Rugby Football Union and New England Free Jacks would be joining forces to bring a high-level rugby union completion to the New England region in the spring of 2019. For the inaugural competition, Connacht, Leinster, Munster, and Ulster featured their academy squads, and the Free Jacks featured up-and-coming professional players from both Ireland and the United States.

2019

References

See also

2019 establishments in Massachusetts
2019 in American rugby union
2019 in Boston
Canton, Massachusetts
Events in Norfolk County, Massachusetts
Irish-American culture in sports
Recurring sporting events established in 2019
Rugby union competitions in the United States
Rugby union in Boston
Sports competitions in Boston
Sports in Norfolk County, Massachusetts
Tourist attractions in Norfolk County, Massachusetts
Weymouth, Massachusetts